ELEAGUE CS:GO Premier 2018 is the sixth season of ELEAGUE that started on July 21, 2018, and ended on July 29, 2018. It was broadcast on the U.S cable network TBS. The season featured eight teams from across the world competing in a season. The broadcast was simultaneously available on the online streaming service Twitch and YouTube Gaming, but when on television, a limited broadcast appeared on Twitch and YouTube.

Results
The finals pitted Astralis, which won the ELEAGUE Major 2017, and Team Liquid. Astralis defeated Team Liquid 2-0 and did not drop a single map in the tournament to win the championship.

Format
The format was similar to that of ELEAGUE Season 2. A total of eight teams competed in the tournament. All eight teams were invited based on their top eight HLTV.org ranks from May 21, 2018. The seeding was the reorganized once the event came around to better reflect the teams' rankings.

The group stage featured two groups of four teams, with each group being a standard GSL format. All matchups wete best of three series. The highest seed in the group played against the lowest seed and the other two teams played against each other. The two winners and two losers then played against each other. The winner of the winner's match moved on to the Playoffs and the loser of the winners match played a third match against the winner of the losers match. The loser of the losers match is eliminated from the tournament. The last two teams in the group will play in a decider's match; the winner of the match will get a spot in the Playoffs and the loser will head home. The top two teams in each group will advance to the Playoffs.

The Playoffs consisted of the four teams. Teams will play in a single elimination, best of three bracket and will keep playing until a winner is decided. Each group winner will face off against a group runner-up in the semifinals.

Teams
Eight teams were invited to the Premier. In parentheses are the HLTV.org ranks from May 21, 2018.

Broadcast Talent
Host
 Alex "Machine" Richardson
Interviewer
 Sue "Smix" Lee
Commentators/Analysts
 James Bardolph
 Anders Blume
 Daniel "ddk" Kapadia
 Jason "moses" O'Toole
 Janko "YNk" Paunović

Group stage

Group A

Group B

Playoffs

Final standings
The final standings, prize money distribution, and teams' rosters and coaches are shown below. Each team's in-game leader is shown first.

References

2018 esports television series
2018 first-person shooter tournaments
Counter-Strike competitions
International esports competitions hosted by the United States
Sports competitions in Atlanta
ELeague competitions